The following is a timeline of the history of the city of Peshawar, Khyber Pakhtunkhwa, Pakistan.

Prior to 19th century

 127 CE - Purushapura becomes eastern capital of Buddhist kingdom Gandhara (approximate date).
 978 CE - Sabaktagin defeats Jayapala.
 1001 - 27 November: Battle of Peshawar; Mahmud of Ghazni in power.
 1006 - Mahmud of Ghazni defeats Anandapala.
 1180 - Mu'izz-Ud-Din Muhammad Ibn Sam in power.
 1630 - Mohabbat Khan Mosque built.
 1758 - 8 May: Battle of Peshawar; Marathas in power.

19th century
 1809 - Mountstuart Elphinstone arrives as ambassador to Shah Shujah.
 1810 - Wazir Bagh (garden) laid out.
 1825 - Sikh Ranjit Singh in power.
 1834
 Hari Singh Nalwa in power.
 Bala Hissar (fort) rebuilt.
 1838 - Italian Paolo Avitabile in power.
 1849
 British in power.
 Gorak Nath Temple built.
 1850s - Grand Trunk Road Lahore-Peshawar extension constructed (approximate date).
 1851 - Peshawar cemetery established.
 1860 - Flood.
 1867 - Municipality constituted.
 1868
 British Peshawar Cantonment laid out near city.
 Population: 56,589 (city); 58,555 (municipality).
 1881 - Population: 79,982.
 1882 - Sethi Mohallah residence built.
 1883 - All Saints Church opens in cantonment.
 1891 - Population: 54,191.
 1900
 Cunningham clock tower built.
 Edwardes College established.

20th century
 1901
 City becomes capital of the North-West Frontier Province.
 Population: 95,147.
 1906 - Victoria Hall built.
 1907 - Peshawar Museum founded.
 1909 - Ancient Buddhist Kanishka casket discovered by archaeologists in Shah-ji-Dheri near city.
 1913 - Islamia College established.
 1922 - Kapoor Haveli (residence) built.
 1925 - Khaiber railway built.
 1930
 23 April: Qissa Khwani Bazaar massacre.
 Novelty cinema opens.
 1932 - Khyber Mail newspaper begins publication.
 1934 - Landsdowne cinema opens.
 1936 - Radio station begins broadcasting.
 1939 - Al Falah newspaper begins publication.
 1941
 Al-Jamiat-e-Sarhad newspaper begins publication.
 Population: 130,967.

Independence: since 1947
 1947 - City becomes part of the Dominion of Pakistan.
 1948 - City becomes capital of the Peshawar province.
 1949 - Frontier Corps military reserve headquartered in Bala Hissar (fort).
 1950
 University of Peshawar established.
 Shahab-e-saqib and Qallandar Urdu-language newspapers begin publication.
 1951 - Population: 151,776.
 1954 - Khyber Medical College established.
 1955
 City becomes part of West Pakistan.
 The Statesman English-language newspaper begins publication.
 Abasin Arts Society established.
 1956 - City becomes part of the Islamic Republic of Pakistan.
 1958 - Amal newspaper begins publication.
 1964 - Peshawar Press Club founded.
 1965 - Bacha Khan International Airport in operation.
 1972 - Population: 268,366.
 1975
 Qayyum Stadium opens.
 Hayatabad suburb established.
 1976 - Wahdat Pashto-language newspaper begins publication.
 1977 - Shahādat newspaper begins publication.
 1980 - May: Explosion at Jamiat Islami Afghanistan headquarters.
 1981
 Population: 555,000.
 Kacha Garhi refugee camp established near city.
 1982
 Jalozai Afghan refugee camp in operation.
 Afghan Islamic Press news agency established.
 1984 - Mujāhid Wulas newspaper begins publication.
 1985
 Karkhano Market and Nishtar Hall established.
 The Frontier Post (English-language) newspaper begins publication.
 1987 - Frontier Times in publication (approximate date).
 1994 - Bus hijacking.
 1995 - Bombing.
 1996 - Qalb-e-Asia Cultural Centre established.
 1998 - Population: 982,816.

21st century
 2004 - Peshawar Panthers cricket team formed.
 2007 - 15 May: suicide Hotel bombing.
 2008 - 6 September and 5 December: Bombings.
 2009
 5 March: Bombing at Rahman Baba shrine.
 9 June: Pearl Continental hotel bombing.
 9 October: Bombing in Khyber Bazaar.
 28 October: Bombing in Mina Bazar.
 19 November: Judicial complex bombing.
 2010
 5 April: attack on the United States consulate.
 19 April: Bombing in Qissa Khwani Bazaar.
 July - August: Flood.
 Air pollution in Peshawar reaches annual mean of 111 PM2.5 and 540 PM10, much higher than recommended.
 2011
 PIA Planetarium inaugurated.
 Saeed Book Bank closes.
 9 March: Suicide bombing.
 10 May: Car bombing kills a journalist.
 12 June: Double bombing in Khyber market area.
 2012 - 15 December: Bacha Khan International Airport attack.
 2013
 21 June: Suicide bombing at Shia mosque in Gulshan Colony.
 22 September: Double suicide bombing at a church.
 29 September: Bombing at Qissa Khwani Bazaar.
 2014
 2 and 11 February: Cinema bombings.
 16 December: School massacre.
 2015 - 13 February: Mosque attack.
 2016 - 16 March: Bus bombing.
 2017
 Population: 1,970,042.
 15 February: Hayatabad bombing.
 8 May: Bombings.
 Dengue outbreak.
 24 November: Police vehicle attack.
 1 December: Agricultural Directorate attack.
 2018 - 10 July : Bombing.
 2020 - 27 October: School boombing.
 2022 - 4 March: Mosque attack.

See also
 History of Peshawar
 Timelines of other cities in Pakistan: Karachi, Lahore
 Urbanisation in Pakistan

References

Bibliography

Published in 19th century
 
 
 
 
 
 

Published in 20th century
  Part 1
 
 
 
 
 
 
 

Published in 21st century

External links

Years in Pakistan
 
Peshawar
Peshawar-related lists
Urbanisation in Pakistan